Ole Christian Marentius Thullin Thams (27 February 1836  – 26 July 1907) was a Norwegian merchant and industrialist.

Biography
Marentius Thams was born at Fredrikstad  in Østfold,  Norway. He was the son of timber trader Wilhelm August Thams (1812–1884) and Ida Olava Mandskow (1812-1889). Thams grew up in Fredrikstad and gained a commercial education, partly abroad. 

He first was associated with his father's lumber business in Fredrikstad. In 1859, his father's business interests were relocated to the Orkdalen region of Sør-Trøndelag.  In 1867, his father  founded Strandheim Brug, a sawmill and timber trade company. The primary of facilities were destroyed by fire in 1872 after which Marentius Thams took over management of the re-built operation. 

In time, Marentius further developed his father's businesses to become the country's largest of its kind.    He made his firm, M. Thams & Co., known around the world through participation in world exhibitions. He also established the first company for export of fresh, iced salmon from Norway during the salmon season, May-July.

Personal life

References

1836 births
1907 deaths
People from Fredrikstad
Norwegian merchants
19th-century Norwegian businesspeople